
Egerton Smith Castle F.S.A. (12 March 1858 – 16 September 1920) was an author, antiquarian, and swordsman, and an early practitioner of reconstructed historical fencing, frequently in collaboration with his colleague Captain Alfred Hutton. Castle was the captain of the British épée and sabre teams at the 1908 Summer Olympics.

He was born in London into a wealthy family; his maternal grandfather was the publishing magnate and philanthropist Egerton Smith. He was a lieutenant of the Second West India Regiment and afterwards a captain of the Royal Engineers Militia. He was also an expert on bookplates and a keen collector.

Egerton Castle co-authored several novels with his wife, Agnes Sweetman Castle.

Selected works 

Schools and Masters of Fencing : From the Middle Ages to the Eighteenth Century,  (2005),  (2006). (The first edition: G. Bell & Sons, London 1885)
"The Baron's Quarry" (short story)
Consequences. London: Richard Bentley and Son. 1891. 3 volume novel.
English Book-plates. An illustrated handbook for students of ex-libris. (G. Bell & sons, London 1893).
The Pride of Jennico (1897, novel, composed with Agnes Castle).
The Pride of Jennico, play based on the novel of same name.
The Bath Comedy (1900, novel, with Agnes Castle). 1916 silent movie, 1930 musical movie in Technicolor. See below, Sweet Kitty Bellairs.
La Bella And Others (short stories published by Macmillan, London 1900).
Marshfield the Observer; and The Death Dance. (fantasy fiction published by Macmillan 1900).
Rose of the World (1905, novel, with Agnes Castle).
Our Sentimental Garden. (with Agnes Castle and illustrated by Charles Robinson) 1914 USA /1915 London.
Count Raven (Cassell, London 1916) novel.
Minniglen. (romance, 1918, with Agnes Castle).

Filmography 
The Pride of Jennico, directed by J. Searle Dawley (1914, based on The Pride of Jennico).
The Incomparable Bellairs, directed by Harold M. Shaw (UK, 1914, based on The Incomparable Bellairs).
The Secret Orchard, directed by Frank Reicher (1915, based on The Secret Orchard).
Sweet Kitty Bellairs, directed by James Young (1916, based on The Bath Comedy).
Rose of the World, directed by Maurice Tourneur (1918, based on Rose of the World).
Young April, directed by Donald Crisp (1926, based on Young April).
Sweet Kitty Bellairs, directed by Alfred E. Green (1930, based on The Bath Comedy).

See also 
Alfred Hutton
Agnes Castle

Sources 
The Edgar Rice Burroughs Library

References

External links 

 
 
 

1858 births
1920 deaths
British male fencers
Historical European martial arts
English male novelists
Olympic fencers of Great Britain
Fellows of the Society of Antiquaries of London
English male non-fiction writers